Pavel Černý (born 28 January 1985) is a Czech football player who currently plays for Czech First League side Pardubice.

In the 2009–2010 season, while playing for Hradec Králové, he scored 14 goals and became the top goalscorer of the Czech 2. Liga together with Dani Chigou and Karel Kroupa.

References

 Profile at iDNES.cz (Czech)

External links
 Guardian Football

1985 births
Living people
Czech footballers
Czech First League players
Kazakhstan Premier League players
FC Hradec Králové players
FK Jablonec players
FC Akzhayik players
FC Ordabasy players
Czech expatriate footballers
Expatriate footballers in Kazakhstan
FK Pardubice players
Association football forwards
Sportspeople from Hradec Králové
Czech National Football League players